Tobaku Hakairoku Kaiji is the second part of the manga series Kaiji by Nobuyuki Fukumoto. It ran in Kodansha's seinen manga magazine Weekly Young Magazine from 2000 to 2004. Kodansha collected its chapters in thirteen tankōbon volumes, released from November 6, 2000, to April 4, 2004. It was followed by the third part, Tobaku Datenroku Kaiji. Tobaku Hakairoku Kaiji was adapted by Madhouse into an anime television series, Kaiji: Against All Rules, which was broadcast in 2011.


Volume list

Omnibus edition

References

Kaiji manga chapter lists